XM Deportivo was a XM Satellite Radio's Spanish language sports channel, located on XM channel 147. During June and July 2006, this channel broadcast the Spanish language play-by-play of the FIFA World Cup 2006.  The channel also covered Spanish play-by-play of Primera División de México, Copa Sudamericana, and Copa Libertadores.

The channel did not join the Sirius lineup since the Sirius/XM merger of channels on November 12, 2008.

See also
XM Satellite Radio channel history

Defunct radio stations in the United States
Radio stations established in 2006
Radio stations disestablished in 2010